Novo Horizonte (portuguese for "New Horizon") is a Brazilian municipality in the west of the state of Santa Catarina. It is situated on a latitude of 26° 26' 40" South, and a longitude of 52° 50' 01" East, at an altitude of 710 metres. It was created in 1992 out of the existing municipality of São Lourenço do Oeste. The population was estimated at 2,404 inhabitants in 2020. The municipality covers 151 km2.

Neighbouring towns
Novo Horizonte is bordered by the following municipalities: 
 São Lourenço do Oeste
 Jupiá
 Galvão
 Coronel Martins
 Santiago do Sul
 Formosa do Sul

External links
 (pt) Official site of the municipality

References

Municipalities in Santa Catarina (state)